"You Can Count on Me" is the second single to be released by Panda Bear from Tomboy. It was released October 19, 2010 by Domino Records.

Gorilla vs. Bear ranked B-side "Alsatian Darn" the 7th best track of 2010 in their "Songs of 2010" list.

Track listing

References

Panda Bear (musician) songs
2010 songs
Domino Recording Company singles